Exeter Mathematics School is a maths school located in Exeter in the English county of Devon.

It opened in September 2014 under the free schools initiative and is sponsored by Exeter College and the University of Exeter. It is intended to be a regional centre of excellence in mathematics for Cornwall, Devon, Dorset and Somerset. As a result, the school offers boarding facilities for pupils who live more than an hours drive away from the school. A total of 120 students are catered for at the school with some boarding from Monday to Friday during term time.

The school is highly selective, with prospective students expected to have GCSE qualifications at grade 8-9 in Mathematics and Physics or Computer Science. Prospective students must also have five GCSEs in total at grade 5 or above including English at grade 6. The course structure of Exeter Mathematics School requires all students to study A-level Mathematics and Further Mathematics and either A-level Physics or Computer Science. Students may choose to study both, but one may be chosen and an additional A-level from a wider range of options, which are taught at Exeter College, may be taken as an alternative.

References

External links

 

 
 

Boarding schools in Devon
Education in Devon
Educational institutions established in 2014
Free schools in England
2014 establishments in England
Mathematics education in the United Kingdom
Schools in Exeter
University of Exeter